The Tristar 64 is an unlicensed add-on for the Nintendo 64 (N64) video game console. Produced in Hong Kong by Future Laboratory, the Tristar 64 features two additional cartridge ports which are designed to accept cartridges created for the Nintendo Entertainment System (NES, a.k.a. Famicom) and Super Nintendo Entertainment System (SNES, a.k.a. Super Famicom).  The device then emulates the NES (via an NES-on-a-chip) or SNES hardware, and allows the cartridge to be run. The device also features built-in cheat cartridge functionality through a program called the X-Terminator, as well as the Memory Editor, which allows SRAM and EEPROM saved game data to be archived and edited.

The Tristar 64 requires a separate power supply, and connects to a television set by way of RCA composite output cables, with the N64's own video output being first routed through the Tristar device. The Tristar 64 is similar to the Super 8, a device which allowed NES cartridges to be played on a SNES console.

References 

 Peer Schneider. "Tristar 64." IGN Gear 22 June 2000. Accessed on 8 April 2005.

Nintendo 64 accessories
Unlicensed Nintendo hardware
Game console intercompatibility hardware

sv:Tristar 64